The Denney Kitfox is a series of small side-by-side, two-seat, high-wing, single engine kit aircraft, designed and originally manufactured by Dan Denney and his company Denney Aerocraft of Boise, Idaho.  The aircraft is amateur-built and not type-certified.  Over 4500 kits have been delivered in 42 different countries.

A derivative of the Avid Flyer, the Kitfox was an early kit plane to feature quickly-folding wings that greatly simplify carriage and storage. The appeal of the aircraft was that it could be built in a two-car garage. Then it would be towed to the airport with the wings folded. The landing gear may be easily converted to floats or skis.

Development and history
First flown in November 1984 from the Denney Aerocraft factory in Boise, the Model 1 Kitfox  was a two-seat STOL taildragger aircraft capable of flying from unimproved strips. The design was originally intended to use a new radial engine then in development and the early Kitfoxes had round cowls with bumps to accommodate the cylinder heads. Although this radial engine did not materialize, and a  Rotax two-stroke engine was adapted instead, the "retro" radial cowling proved popular and was retained on many models. In 1984 a total of six Model 1 Kitfoxes were delivered and then the model range was expanded to include the improved Models 2, 3, 4, and Classic 4.

In June 1992 Denney Aerocraft sold the rights to the design to SkyStar Aircraft. Skystar started work on a new aircraft, the Kitfox Series 5. This aircraft was designed to be larger, with an increased useful load, cabin and cargo space, and to use certified aircraft engines. The Series 5 was produced as a conventional landing gear-equipped aircraft with the names Outback and Safari and also as a tricycle gear aircraft, the Vixen and Voyager. An employee consortium took over SkyStar Aircraft in January 2000, and this reorganized company launched the Kitfox Series 6. Later in 2000 the company also introduced the Kitfox "Lite Squared", a lightened version of the Kitfox Classic 4, as a two-seat ultralight trainer for the single-seat ultralight Kitfox Lite.

In 2002, SkyStar introduced the Kitfox Series 7. The Series 7 design conformed to the then-proposed Federal Aviation Administration Light Sport Aircraft category better than did the Lite Squared and it became the company's main model. As the LSA rules were further developed and gross weights increased, it became evident that a special version of the Kitfox Series 7, to be known as the Kitfox Sport, would not be needed and that all three Kitfoxes then in production — the Lite, Classic 4 and Series 7 — would meet the revised LSA category definition.

In late 2005 SkyStar Aircraft filed for bankruptcy. In April 2006, the assets of Skystar were purchased by Kitfox Aircraft, a newly formed company owned by John and Debra McBean. John McBean is a former SkyStar employee, having left the company in 2003.

Variants
Model 1
Original 1984 model with radial engine cowl and  Rotax 532 as the standard engine. A total of 257 kits were produced.

Model 2
The larger, wider Kitfox Model 2 was introduced in 1989 and available with the  Rotax 582 engine. The gross weight was increased to 950 lb (431 kg). 490 were produced.

Model 3
The Kitfox Model 3 features structural changes that were designed to improve flight characteristics and provide a better platform for more powerful engines including the  Rotax 912. A total of 466 were produced.

Model 4-1050  
The Kitfox Model 4 was a new design introduced in 1991. It incorporated a laminar flow airfoil, new flaperon design, metal flaperon attach brackets and a new 2:1 differential aileron control system. The gross weight of the Kitfox Model 4-1050 was the same as the Model 3, . The Model 4 standard engines include the  Rotax 912 and the  Rotax 912S. 322 were built.

Model 4-1200 (Classic IV)
The Kitfox Model 4-1200, also known as the Classic 4, is the final version of the original 1984 Denney Kitfox.

Model 4 Speedster
A variant of the Classic 4 with a shorter wing for a higher cruise speed and roll rate.

Kitfox XL
A lightweight variant of the Classic 4 introduced in 1994, with the  Rotax 503 as the standard power plant. The aircraft was intended as an ultralight trainer, but did not sell well.

Kitfox Lite
Single-seat ultralight design for the United States market by Skystar Aircraft. The Lite features similar styling to larger Kitfoxes, including the radial-style cowling, folding wings and Junkers flaperons. Original engine was a special model of the 2si 460-F35 two-cylinder, two-stroke powerplant converted to free-air cooling and direct drive, producing 

Kitfox Lite2 
An upgraded variant of the Kitfox XL, introduced in 2001. Powered by a  Rotax 503, the Lite2 also features the popular radial-style cowling, flaperons and a welded steel tube fuselage, all covered in Stits Aircraft Polyfiber aircraft fabric. The aircraft was a success and sold well as both a complete aircraft and as a kit plane.

Series 5 (Safari, Vixen, Outback, Voyager)
Intended to use Continental and Lycoming certified engines in addition to the Rotax 912 engines, the Series 5 was introduced in 1994. The tailwheel version was named the Safari and the tricycle gear version was named the Vixen. The Vixen incorporated a swept tail, which was a cosmetic change that did not affect performance. In 1998, the marketing name of the Safari was changed to Outback and the Vixen to Voyager.

Series 5 Speedster
A variant of the Series 5 with a shorter wing for a higher cruise speed.

Series 6
The aircraft can be converted from tricycle gear to tailwheel and back again.

Series 7
Other engines available include Continental, Lycoming, Rotax 912S, Rotec R2800, Jabiru 3300 and the Rotax 915is engine. In the United States Light Sport Aircraft category it is marketed as the Super Sport. The construction time from the factory-supplied kit is estimated at 1000 hours.

Series 7 STI

A version of the Series 7 with a larger airfoil to increase STOL (short take-off and landing) performance.

Series 7 Speedster

A version of the Series 7 with shorter wings to increase speed much like the Series 4 Speedster.

Kitfox SLSA
Version of the Series 7 for the light sport aircraft market, with  gross take-off weight and the  Rotax 912ULS engine. The model is on the Federal Aviation Administration's list of approved United States Light Sport Aircraft.

Derivative designs
Since early 2009, Belite Aircraft, a new company based in Wichita, Kansas has produced the Belite Aircraft Superlite derivative of the Kitfox Lite single-seat ultralight design.

Belite Aircraft "has acquired the production rights to a previously designed aircraft, the Kitfox Lite" and has "acquired the tooling, existing parts and manufacturing rights to the aircraft in March of 2009. As a condition of the transaction, they agreed to rebrand the airplane to prevent any confusion with the larger, two-place light sport Kitfox". It has a metal airframe and is covered in poly-fiber fabric.

In Europe, the Apollo Fox and Aeropro Eurofox are based upon the Kitfox, with their Junkers flaps and folding wings. Both are Rotax-powered, side-by-side two-seaters, and are available either as taildraggers or with tricycle gear. The Light Aircraft Association's chief engineer, Francis Donaldson, tested a Eurofox and declared that "the manufacturer Aeropro has refined and greatly improved a kit plane classic".

Specifications (Kitfox Classic IV)

See also

References

External links

 Kitfox Aircraft LLC
Kitplanes review of the Series 7 Speedster

Homebuilt aircraft
1980s United States civil utility aircraft
Light-sport aircraft
High-wing aircraft
Single-engined tractor aircraft
Aircraft first flown in 1984